Anna "Annie" Moore (April 24, 1874 – December 6, 1924) was an Irish émigré who was the first immigrant to the United States to pass through federal immigrant inspection at the Ellis Island station in New York Harbor. Bronze statues of Moore, created by Irish sculptor Jeanne Rynhart, are located at Cobh in Ireland (Moore's point of departure) and Ellis Island (point of arrival).

Immigration
Moore arrived from County Cork, Ireland aboard the Guion Line steamship Nevada in 1892. Her brothers, Anthony and Philip, who journeyed with her, had just turned 15 and 12, respectively. As the first person to pass inspection at the newly opened facility, she was presented with an American $10 gold piece from an American official.

Family
Moore's parents, Matthew and Julia, had come to the United States in 1888 and were living at 32 Monroe Street in Manhattan. Annie married a son of German Catholic immigrants, Joseph Augustus Schayer (1876–1960), a salesman at Manhattan's Fulton Fish Market, with whom she had about eleven children. She died of heart failure on December 6, 1924 at age 50 and is buried in Calvary Cemetery, Queens. Her previously unmarked grave was identified in August 2006. On October 11, 2008, a dedication ceremony was held at Calvary which celebrated the unveiling of a marker for her grave, a Celtic Cross made of Irish Blue Limestone. She had 11 children of whom five survived to adulthood, and three of them had children. The rest all died before the age of three.

Mistaken identity
A woman named "Annie Moore" who died near Fort Worth, Texas, in 1924 had long been thought to be the one whose arrival marked the beginning of Ellis Island. Further research, however, established that the Annie Moore in Texas was born in Illinois.

Legacy
Annie Moore is honored by two statues sculpted by Jeanne Rynhart. One stands near Cobh Heritage Centre (formerly Queenstown), her port of departure, and another at Ellis Island, her port of arrival. The image is meant to represent the millions who passed through Ellis Island in pursuit of the American dream.

Annie Moore's life also inspired the song "Isle of Hope, Isle of Tears", which was written by Brendan Graham after visiting Ellis Island. The song has been performed by Ronan Tynan, The Irish Tenors, Sean Keane, Dolores Keane, Daniel O'Donnell, Celtic Thunder, Celtic Woman, Tommy Fleming and The High Kings.

Things named in honour of Moore include the Annie Moore Award, presented annually by the Irish American Cultural Institute, a utility vessel operated for the National Park Service, and a software program developed at Worcester Polytechnic Institute in Massachusetts, Lund University in Sweden, and the University of Oxford in Britain which uses a "matching algorithm" to allocate refugees with no ties to the host country to their new homes.

Gallery

See also 
 Arne Pettersen, the last person to go through Ellis Island.

References

External links 

 A Ticket to History - Famous passengers on the Statue of Liberty-Ellis Island Foundation website
 "Irish Immigrant First To Pass Through Ellis Island", from the Statue of Liberty-Ellis Island Foundation website (archived 2010)

People from the Lower East Side
People from County Cork
1874 births
1924 deaths
Ellis Island
Irish emigrants to the United States (before 1923)
Burials at Calvary Cemetery (Queens)
Catholics from New York (state)